Craonne  is a commune in the Aisne department in Hauts-de-France in northern France, northwest of Reims.

History
It was the site of the Napoleonic Battle of Craonne in 1814. The former town was totally destroyed by artillery during the Nivelle Offensive in World War I, inspiring the song La Chanson de Craonne. It had an arboretum. The town that exists today was rebuilt from the 1920s.

Geography
The river Ailette forms part of the commune's northern border.

Population

Sights
 Arboretum de Craonne
 Chemin des Dames
Battle of Craonne
La Chanson de Craonne

See also
Communes of the Aisne department

References

Communes of Aisne
Aisne communes articles needing translation from French Wikipedia